Barnaby Kay (born 9 April 1969) is an English actor who has played roles in television, stage, film and performance art. He was a member of the Royal Shakespeare Company.

Personal life 

Kay was born at St Pancras, London, and is the son of actor Richard Kay (1937–1985), and the
grandson of entertainer Arthur Kay (died 1970). He is married to actress Nicola Walker, with whom he has a son.

Career 
Among other roles, Kay has appeared in The Five (2016), Wallander (2012–15), Doctor Who (2015), New Tricks (2013–14), Frankie (2013), Public Enemies (2011), Wuthering Heights (2009), Holby City (2008), Midsomer Murders (2005), Spooks (2004), Prime Suspect (2003), Serious and Organised (2003), Silent Witness (2002), Conspiracy (2001), The Bill (2000), Casualty (1999), Shakespeare in Love (1998), Croupier (1998), Jonathan Creek (1997), Cracker (1996), The Vet (1995) and Minder (1994).

Theatre 
Kay's theatre work includes A Streetcar Named Desire at the Donmar Warehouse (2009), Orlando in As You Like It at the Novello Theatre (2006), Closer at the National Theatre (1999–2000), Pierre Bezuhov in Warring Peas at the Hampstead Theatre (2008), Tinky Winky, Teletubbies tour (2011-2016), Steve Calhanm in Eric Larue at the Soho Theatre (2006), and Alexander Petrovich Kalabushkin in Dying For It at the Almeida Theatre (2007).

Radio 
The Lovecraft Investigations
 2018 The Case of Charles Dexter Ward. BBC Radio 4.
2019 The Whisperer in Darkness. BBC Radio 4.
2020 The Shadow Over Innsmouth. BBC Radio 4.

References

External links
 
 'Macbeth at the Albery - The Inside Story' (2002)
 Kay on the Royal Shakespeare Company website

1969 births
Living people
English male television actors
English male film actors
English male stage actors
Male actors from London
People from St Pancras, London
20th-century English male actors
21st-century English male actors